Goleta Point (also known as Campus Point) is a small peninsula on the central coast in the U.S. state of California. It is 
The point forms an extension into Santa Barbara Channel and is situated within the campus of University of California, Santa Barbara (UCSB). It is characterized by a beach cliff, crashing waves, and a view of the Channel Islands. The rock formation is frequented by shorebirds.

History
From 1870 to 1890, Goleta Point was used as a whaling camp, with Italian and Portuguese crews situated at the locale. Goleta Point contained a defunct United States Marine Corps Santa Barbara Air Station when it was purchased in 1950 by the University of California.  The site is now known as Campus Point. The Campus Point State Marine Conservation Area was established in 2012.

Geography
The Isla Vista community is located between Goleta Point and Coal Oil Point. From Goleta Point to Point Conception, the coast is more rugged than further east. The point is west of the Santa Barbara Light. Goleta Point is on sheltered stretch of the coast line which is not affected by the westerly and northwesterly winds. The water is clean.

Goleta point is said to contain one of Santa Barbara's best surf breaks. The break conditions are dependent entirely on the wind direction, direction of the swell, and the tide can create unfavorable conditions. But generally, waves generated in a southwest direction are head high and to a slightly medium height. During an above-average break point "swell wells up to create a solid face that has a wide peak." During low and medium tide periods, the rides can be of longer duration provided the tide does not bounce back from the reef.

References

Landforms of Santa Barbara County, California
Peninsulas of California
Goleta, California
University of California, Santa Barbara